Seppo Rytkönen is a Finnish orienteering competitor. He received a bronze medal in the relay event at the 1981 World Orienteering Championships in Thun, together with Kari Sallinen, Ari Anjala and Hannu Kottonen.

See also
 Finnish orienteers
 List of orienteers
 List of orienteering events

References

Year of birth missing (living people)
Living people
Finnish orienteers
Male orienteers
Foot orienteers
World Orienteering Championships medalists